{{Taxobox
| name = Lomanotus vermiformis
| image = Lomanotus vermiformis.png
| image_caption = Lomanotus vermiformis on substrate with egg mass.
| regnum = Animalia
| phylum = Mollusca
| classis = Gastropoda
| unranked_superfamilia= clade Heterobranchia
clade Euthyneura
clade Nudipleura
clade Nudibranchia
clade Dexiarchia
clade Cladobranchia
clade Dendronotida
| superfamilia = Tritonioidea
| familia = Lomanotidae
| genus = Lomanotus
| species = L. vermiformis
| binomial = Lomanotus vermiformis
| binomial_authority = Eliot, 1908<ref name="Eliot1908">Eliot C. N. E. (1908). "Reports on the marine biology of the Sudanese Red Sea XI. Notes on a collection of nudibranchs from the Red Sea". Journal of the Linnean Society, Zoology, 31: 86-122.</ref>
| synonyms_ref = 
| synonyms =
 Lomanotus stauberi Clark & Goetzfried, 1976
}}Lomanotus vermiformis is a species of sea slug, a marine gastropod mollusk in the family Lomanotidae.

Taxonomy
This species was synonymised with the Caribbean species Lomanotus stauberi in 1988.

The specific name vermiformis is from Latin language and it means "in the shape of a worm" referring to elongate body of this species.

 Distribution 
The distribution of Lomanotus vermiformis is circumtropical. This species was described from the Red Sea. It has also been reported widely from tropical seas in the Indo-Pacific region. Records from the Western Atlantic includes Florida, Bahamas and Panama.

 Description 
The body shape is very elongate and narrow. Rhinophoral sheaths are with papillae and they are elevated to cover three quarters of the rhinophores. Cerata are very short and pointed. Background color is brown with dark brown spots and opaque yellow lines. Opaque white reticulations is also present across the body. The maximum recorded body length is 40 mm,Welch J. J. (2010). "The “Island Rule” and Deep-Sea Gastropods: Re-Examining the Evidence". PLoS ONE 5(1): e8776. doi:10.1371/journal.pone.0008776. but it is usually smaller than 25 mm.

Ecology 
Minimum recorded depth is 1 m. Maximum recorded depth is 4.5 m.Lomanotus vermiformis feeds on the common stinging hydroid Lytocarpus philippinus and on hydroids of the genus Macrorhynchia. It was also found feeding on an unidentified species of hydroid in Panama, on which it is extremely cryptic.Lomanotus vermiformis'' can swim with lateral flexions of the body when disturbed.

References
This article incorporates Creative Commons (CC-BY-4.0) text from the reference

External links 
 

Lomanotidae
Pantropical fauna
Gastropods described in 1908